Helen Fielding (born 19 February 1958) is an English novelist and screenwriter, best known as the creator of the fictional character Bridget Jones, and a sequence of novels and films beginning with the life of a thirty something singleton in London trying to make sense of life and love. Bridget Jones's Diary (1996) and   Bridget Jones: The Edge of Reason (1999) were published in 40 countries and sold more than 15 million copies. The two films of the same name achieved international success. In a survey conducted by The Guardian newspaper, Bridget Jones's Diary was named as one of the ten novels that best defined the 20th century.

Bridget Jones: Mad About the Boy was published in autumn 2013 with record-breaking first-day sales in the UK exceeding 46,000 copies.  It occupied the number one spot on The Sunday Times bestseller list for six months. In her review for The New York Times review, Sarah Lyall called the novel "sharp and humorous" and said that Fielding had "allowed her heroine to grow up into someone funnier and more interesting than she was before". Late 2016 saw the release of the third movie: Bridget Jones's Baby. On 11 October 2016, and the publication of Fielding's sixth novel, Bridget Jones' Baby: the Diaries based on Fielding's original columns in The Independent newspaper on which the movie — which broke UK box office records — was based.

In a 2004 poll for the BBC, Fielding was named the 29th most influential person in British culture. In December 2016, the BBC's Woman's Hour included Bridget Jones as one of the seven women who had most influenced British female culture over the last seven decades.

Biography
Fielding grew up in Morley, West Yorkshire, a textile town on the outskirts of Leeds in the north of England. Her father was managing director of a textile factory, next door to the family home, that produced cloth for miners’ donkey jackets. He died in 1982 and her mother, Nellie, remained in Yorkshire, passing away in September 2021. 

Fielding attended Wakefield Girls' High School, one of the Grammar Schools in the Wakefield Grammar School Foundation. She has three siblings, Jane, David and Richard.

Fielding studied English at St Anne's College, Oxford and was part of the Oxford revue at the 1978 Edinburgh Festival, forming a continuing friendship with a group of comic performers and writers including Richard Curtis and Rowan Atkinson.

Fielding began work at the BBC in 1979 as a regional researcher on the news magazine Nationwide. She progressed to working as a production manager on various children’s and light entertainment shows. In 1985 Fielding produced a live satellite broadcast from a refugee camp in Eastern Sudan for the launch of Comic Relief. She also wrote and produced documentaries in Africa for the first two Comic Relief fundraising broadcasts. In 1989 she was a researcher for an edition of the Thames TV This Week series "Where Hunger is a Weapon" about the Southern Sudan rebel war. These experiences formed the basis for her debut novel, Cause Celeb.

From 1990 – 1999 she worked as a journalist and columnist on several national newspapers, including The Sunday Times, The Independent and The Telegraph. Her best-known work, Bridget Jones's Diary, began its life as an unattributed column in The Independent in 1995. The success of the column led to four novels and three film adaptations. Fielding was part of the scriptwriting team for all three.

Bridget Jones
Fielding's first novel, Cause Celeb was published in 1994 to great reviews but limited sales. She was struggling to make ends meet while working on her second novel, a satire about cultural divides in the Caribbean when she was approached by London's The Independent newspaper to write a column as herself about single life in London. Fielding rejected this idea as too embarrassing and exposing and offered instead to create an imaginary, exaggerated, comic character.

Writing anonymously, she felt able to be honest about the preoccupations of single women in their thirties. The column quickly acquired a following, her identity was revealed and her publishers asked her to replace her novel about the Caribbean by a novel on Bridget Jones's Diary. The hardback was published in 1996 to good reviews but modest sales. The paperback, published in 1997, went straight to the top of the best-seller chart, stayed there for over six months and went on to become a worldwide best-seller.

Fielding continued her columns in The Independent, and then The Daily Telegraph until 1997, publishing a second Bridget novel  The Edge of Reason in November 1999. The film of Bridget Jones's Diary was released in 2001 and its sequel in 2004. Fielding contributed the further adventures of Bridget Jones for The Independent from 2005. Fielding announced in November 2012 that she was now writing a third instalment in the Bridget Jones series.

Bridget Jones: Mad About the Boy was published in the UK by Jonathan Cape and in the US by Alfred A. Knopf in October 2013. It debuted at number one on The Sunday Times bestseller list, and number seven on The New York Times bestseller list. By the time the UK paperback was published on 19 June 2014, sales had reached one million copies. The novel was shortlisted for the 15th Bollinger Everyman Wodehouse Prize, nominated in the Popular Fiction category of the National Book Award. and has been translated into 32 languages.

Personal life
Fielding divides her time between London and Los Angeles. She and Kevin Curran, a writer/executive producer on The Simpsons, began a relationship in 2000 and Fielding had two children with him: Dashiell, born in February 2004, and Romy, born in July 2006. Kevin Curran died from cancer complications on 26 October 2016.

Honours
In 2014, Fielding was one of twenty writers on The Sunday Times list of Britain's 500 Most Influential and was also featured on the London Evening Standards 1,000 Most Influential Londoners list.

Awards and nominations
1997 British Book of the Year
2002 Writers Guild of America nomination, Best Screenplay
2002 BAFTA nomination, Best Screenplay
2002 Evening Standard Award Best Screenplay
2013 Bollinger Everyman Wodehouse Prize shortlist
2013 National Book Award nomination, Best Popular Fiction
2016 (Evening Standard)  Peter Sellers Award for Comedy
2016 Honorary Doctorate of Literature, University of York
2017 Bollinger Everyman Wodehouse Prize for Bridget Jones’s Baby: The Diaries

Bibliography
Who's Had Who, in Association with Berk’s Rogerage, an Historical Rogister Containing Official Lay Lines of History from the Beginning of Time to the Present Day (1987; 1990 in US with first subtitle omitted) (with Simon Bell and Richard Curtis)
Cause Celeb (1994) is a satire, based on the relationship between celebrities and refugees set in a camp in a fictional country in East Africa.
Bridget Jones's Diary (1996)
 Bridget Jones: The Edge of Reason (1999)
Olivia Joules and the Overactive Imagination (2003), a comic spy novel set in Miami, Los Angeles, England and the Sudan.
Bridget Jones: Mad About the Boy (2013)
Bridget Jones's Baby: The Diaries (2016)

Short stories
 Ox-tales (2009) a collection of short stories in aid of Oxfam

Film adaptations
 Bridget Jones's Diary (2001). Starring Renée Zellweger, Hugh Grant, Colin Firth. Written by Richard Curtis, Andrew Davies, Helen Fielding. Directed by Sharon Maguire. Produced by Working Title Films.
 Bridget Jones: The Edge of Reason (2004). Starring Renée Zellweger, Hugh Grant, Colin Firth. Written by Adam Brooks, Richard Curtis, Andrew Davies, Helen Fielding. Directed by Beeban Kidron. Produced by Working Title Films.
 Bridget Jones's Baby (2016) Starring Renee Zellweger, Colin Firth, Patrick Dempsey. Written by Helen Fielding, Emma Thompson, Dan Mazer, Directed by Sharon Maguire. Produced by Working Title Films.

References

External links
 Helen Fielding profile and articles at The Guardian

1958 births
Living people
English women novelists
English humorists
British chick lit writers
Alumni of St Anne's College, Oxford
People from Morley, West Yorkshire
Women humorists
Bridget Jones
Writers from Leeds